Uzreport TV is a private non-governmental news channel in Uzbekistan. The channel began broadcasting April 28, 2014 on the territory of Uzbekistan. The channel belongs to the News Agency «UzReport», which to date is shown in the information space created in 1999, the Internet portal uzreport.uz.

References

External links
 Official website

Uzbek-language television stations
Mass media in Uzbekistan
Public broadcasting
Companies based in Tashkent
Russian-language television stations
Television channels and stations established in 2014